Ferme-Neuve (French for "New Farm") is a municipality part of the Antoine-Labelle Regional County Municipality, in the Laurentides region of Quebec, Canada. It is the largest incorporated municipality of the Laurentides region.

History
In the 19th century, the area began attracting loggers because of its rich red and white pine stands. In 1850, the James MacLaren logging company built a large tree farm called "La Ferme de la Montagne" that was used as a supply camp for loggers. It was sold in 1888 to Cyrille Lafontaine and inhabited by his son Léonard who became the first settler and farmer of Ferme-Neuve. In 1898, the Ferme-Neuve Post Office opened.

In 1902, a group of 8 Montreal journalists, under direction from Lomer Gouin, Minister of Colonization, built a model farm in order to attract more settlers. They also launched a public subscription to build a school. In recognition, the lake adjacent to the settlement was called Lac des Journalistes ("Lake of Journalists").

Also in 1902, the United Township Municipality of Würtele-Moreau-et-Gravel was formed, with Toussaint Cloutier as first mayor. In 1917, the Ferme-Neuve settlement separated from the united township and became an incorporated village, with Henri Berthiaume as its first mayor. In 1930, the United Township Municipality of Würtele-Moreau-et-Gravel changed statutes and was renamed to the Parish Municipality of Ferme-Neuve.

On December 24, 1997, both entities were merged again into the new Municipality of Ferme-Neuve.

Demographics

Population trend (prior to amalgamation):
 Population in 1996:
 Parish of Ferme-Neuve: 913
 Village of Ferme-Neuve: 2178
 Population in 1991:
 Parish of Ferme-Neuve: 907
 Village of Ferme-Neuve: 2267

Private dwellings occupied by usual residents: 1,276 (total dwellings: 1,453)

Mother tongue:
 English as first language: 0.8%
 French as first language: 98.8%
 English and French as first language: 0%
 Other as first language: 0.4%

Local government

List of former mayors:
 Sylvain Leduc (...–2005)
 Claude Dufour (2005–2009)
 Gilbert Pilote (2009–2021)
 Diane Sirard (2021–present)

See also
List of municipalities in Quebec

References

External links

Incorporated places in Laurentides
Municipalities in Quebec